Ann K. Covington (born March 5, 1942) is a former chief justice of the Supreme Court of Missouri. She was the first woman to hold that position. Covington served on the Supreme Court from 1989 to 2001; in 2001 she joined the large St. Louis, Missouri law firm Bryan Cave. Covington is 1963 graduate of Duke University where she received a Bachelor of Arts in English literature. She received her Juris Doctor from the University of Missouri in 1977. She is a native of Fairmont, West Virginia. 
She lives in Columbia, Missouri.

See also
 List of female state supreme court justices

References

External links
Bryan Cave page

1942 births
Living people
20th-century American judges
20th-century American women lawyers
20th-century American lawyers
20th-century American women judges
21st-century American women judges
21st-century American judges
Methodists from Missouri
Chief Justices of the Supreme Court of Missouri
Duke University alumni
Judges of the Supreme Court of Missouri
Lawyers from St. Louis
Lawyers from Columbia, Missouri
Lawyers from Fairmont, West Virginia
University of Missouri alumni
Women chief justices of state supreme courts in the United States
Women in Missouri politics